Alan Seiden (May 1, 1937 – May 3, 2008) was an American collegiate and professional basketball player.  He led St. John's University to the 1959 National Invitation Tournament title and later played professionally with the Pittsburgh Rens of the American Basketball League.

Seiden was a New York City schoolboy star at Jamaica High School, leading his team to the PSAL title in 1955 as a senior.  He chose to stay close to home for college, playing for Hall of Fame coach Joe Lapchick at St. John's University.  Seiden became a star at St. John's, leading the Redmen to two straight National Invitation Tournaments in 1958 and 1959.  Seiden averaged 20.4 and 21.9 points per game as a junior and senior and ended his Redmen career with 1,374 points.  He served as team captain both seasons

He won a gold medal in basketball with Team USA in the 1957 Maccabiah Games, and was the top scorer in the tournament.

In 1959, Seiden led the Redmen to the NIT title as the unseeded 17–9 squad upset the field to win a tournament that was then seen as prestigious as the NCAA tournament.  Seiden capped his senior season by being named a consensus second team All-American and won the Haggerty Award as the top player in the New York City metro area.

After his college career ended, Seiden was drafted in the second round of the 1959 NBA draft by the St. Louis Hawks.  He failed to make the roster, and played for the next few years in the Eastern Professional Basketball League and in 1961 with the Pittsburgh Rens of the American Basketball League.

Seiden died on May 3, 2008 of complications from stroke.

In March 2011, he was inducted into the National Jewish Sports Hall of Fame.

References

1937 births
2008 deaths
All-American college men's basketball players
American men's basketball players
Basketball players from New York City
Jewish men's basketball players
Pittsburgh Rens players
Point guards
Sportspeople from Queens, New York
St. John's Red Storm men's basketball players
St. Louis Hawks draft picks
Williamsport Billies (basketball) players
Competitors at the 1957 Maccabiah Games
Maccabiah Games basketball players of the United States
Maccabiah Games gold medalists for the United States
Maccabiah Games medalists in basketball